Serena Ng (born 1959) is the Edwin W. Rickert Professor of Economics at Columbia University. Her fields of research and interest include macroeconomics, time series, econometrics, and big data.

Education
Ng received a B.A. and M.A. from University of Western Ontario. Later, she did her Ph.D. at Princeton University in 1993.

Career
She was an associate professor at Boston College and Johns Hopkins University from 1996 to 2003. She later became a professor in University of Michigan from 2003 to 2007. She has been a professor at Columbia University since 2007. Ng is also a research associate with the National Bureau of Economic Research.

She was the co-editor of the Journal of Business and Economic Statistics from 2007 to 2009. She has been the managing editor of the Journal of Econometrics since 2019.

References

Canadian economists
Canadian women economists
Living people
1959 births
Princeton University alumni
Columbia University faculty
University of Michigan faculty
Fellows of the Econometric Society
University of Western Ontario alumni